Valea Caselor may refer to several places in Romania:

 Valea Caselor, a village in Câmpeni town, Alba County
 Valea Caselor, a village in Lipova Commune, Bacău County
 Valea Caselor, a village in Valea Mare Commune, Dâmbovița County
 Valea Caselor, a village in Drăgăşani city, Vâlcea County
 Valea Caselor, a village in Popești Commune, Vâlcea County
 Valea Caselor, tributary of the Arieș near Câmpeni, Alba County
 Valea Caselor (Lupșa), tributary of the Arieș near Lupșa, Alba County
 Valea Caselor, tributary of the Breboaia in Maramureș County
 Valea Caselor, tributary of the Dâmbovița in Argeș County
 Valea Caselor, tributary of the Homorod in Brașov County
 Valea Caselor, tributary of the Iza in Maramureș County 
 Valea Caselor (Sebeș), tributary of the Sebeș in Sibiu County
 Valea Caselor, tributary of the Someșul Mare in Bistrița-Năsăud County
 Valea Caselor, tributary of the Valchid in Sibiu County